Max Heinz Liepmann (27 August 1905 – 6 June 1966) was a German writer and journalist. Liepmann was born in Osnabrück, Province of Hanover, Prussia, and died in Agarone, Ticino, Switzerland.

Bibliography
Fires Underground (1936)
Nights of an Old Child (1937).  Translated by A. Lynton Hudson. Philadelphia: J.B. Lippincott Company.
Murder--Made in Germany.
Wanderers in the Mist.
Peace Broke Out.

References

External links
 
 Biografie
 

1905 births
1966 deaths
Writers from Osnabrück
People from the Province of Hanover
German male writers